The Índice de Precios y Cotizaciones (IPC) is the weighted measurement index of 35 stocks traded on the Bolsa Mexicana de Valores. The recomposition of the index has its methodology originating and exposing on the BMV, and may change every quarter.

Components
The companies  are:

Annual Returns 
The following table shows the annual development of the IPC since 1991.

References

External links
 
Reuters page for .MXX
Bloomberg page for MEXBOL:IND
Top Companies in Mexico

Mexican stock market indices